Hanuman.com is a Bengali thriller film shot in Iceland, starring Prosenjit Chatterjee. The film was released on 6 December 2013.

Plot

AnjaniPutra Sensharma (Prosenjit Chatterjee) is a school teacher in a small village named Basirhat in West Bengal. He lives with his wife Tanushree (Mousumi Bhattacharya) and his old moped. Under a school grant, AnjaniPutra and the other teachers are given a desktop computer for home use. On the computer, he makes a friend named Maria Fischer (Saskia Ranwig) who claims to be from Reykjavik in Iceland. When AnjaniPutra witnesses her to be murdered by a masked man on webcam, he succumbs to a psychological shock. Determined to find out her murderer he takes a flight to Iceland selling his ancestral land. Soon being befuddled in a foreign country he finds rescue in the Bangladeshi family of Hassan (Gaurav Pandey) settled there. A father-daughter like relation grows up between AnjaniPutra and Hassan's daughter Nuri (Saloni Pandey). Eventually, he finds out that the address given by Maria is false. Nonetheless, Nuri hacks into Maria's computer and finds out that her murderer is actually the local mayor (Oli Bigalke) who moonlights as a sociopathic rapist. Nuri sends him several emails tricking him to believe that Maria is actually alive. Then she steals a gun from her father's closet and persuades AnjaniPutra to confront the murderer. Although initially frightened and reluctant, AnjaniPutra finally guns the murderer down when he attempts to assault a decoy of Maria. Maria's dead body is soon found in a lake in Munich, Germany and AnjaniPutra becomes headline in several international newspaper. Finally AnjaniPutra returns home to a tearful Tanushree and the film concludes.

Cast
 Prosenjit Chatterjee as AnjaniPutra
 Mousumi Bhattacharya as Tanushree
 Saloni Pandey as Nuri
 Gaurabh Pandey as Hassan
 Rudranil Ghosh as cableman Panchu
 Kaushik Sen as Geography teacher
 Kharaj Mukherjee as Police Inspector
 Saskia Ranwig as Maria Fischer
 Oli Bigalke as a Mayor
 Þórunn Guðlaugsdóttir as Wife of Hassan

Soundtrack

References

External links
Hanuman.com Website

2013 films
Films shot in Iceland
Indian detective films
Bengali-language Indian films
2010s Bengali-language films
2013 thriller films